John Bernard Larroquette (born November 25, 1947) is an American actor. He is known for his starring roles in the NBC military drama series Baa Baa Black Sheep (1976–1978), the NBC sitcom Night Court (1984–1992; 2023–present) for which he received four consecutive Primetime Emmy Awards for Outstanding Supporting Actor in a Comedy Series during the earlier incarnation, the NBC sitcom The John Larroquette Show (1993–1996), the David E. Kelley legal drama series The Practice (1997–2002), the ABC legal comedy-drama series Boston Legal (2004–2008), and the TNT series The Librarians (2014–2018).

In 2011, he made his Broadway debut in the musical revival of Frank Loesser's How to Succeed in Business Without Really Trying alongside Daniel Radcliffe. He played J.B. Bigley in a role for which he received a Tony Award for Best Featured Actor in a Musical, and a Drama Desk Award for Outstanding Featured Actor in a Musical. The following year he starred as William Russell in the Broadway revival of Gore Vidal's The Best Man (2012) directed by Mike Nichols starring James Earl Jones, Candice Bergen, and Angela Lansbury.

He made his film debut by providing the opening narration of the horror film The Texas Chain Saw Massacre (1974), following which he appeared in films such as Stripes (1981), Meatballs Part II (1984), Richie Rich (1994), and the Hallmark Channel mystery series McBride (2005–2008).

Early life
Larroquette was born in New Orleans, Louisiana, the son of Berthalla Oramous (née Helmstetter), a department store clerk who mostly sold children's clothes, and John Edgar Larroquette Jr., who was in the United States Navy. His paternal grandfather, John Larroquette Sr., was born in France and emigrated to the United States in 1895.

Larroquette grew up in the Ninth Ward of New Orleans, near the French Quarter. He played clarinet and saxophone through childhood and into high school, where he and some friends organized a band they called The N.U.D.L.E.S (The New Universal Demonstration for Love, Ecstasy and Sound). He discovered acting in his senior year at Francis T. Nicholls High School.

He moved to Hollywood in 1973 after working in radio as a DJ during the early days of underground radio, when each disc jockey was free to play what they wished.

Career

Early career
His first acting role in Hollywood was providing the opening voiceover narration for The Texas Chain Saw Massacre (1974). Larroquette did this as a favor for the film's director Tobe Hooper. His first series regular role was in the 1970s NBC program Baa Baa Black Sheep, where he portrayed a World War II United States Marine Corps fighter pilot, 2nd Lt. Bob Anderson.

In a 1975 appearance on Sanford and Son, Larroquette plays Lamont's counterpart in a fictitious sitcom based on Fred and Lamont called "Steinberg and Son". During the filming of Stripes (1981), his nose was nearly cut off in an accident. He ran down a hall into a door that was supposed to open but did not, and his head went through the window in the door.

Night Court (1984–1992)

Larroquette played Dan Fielding on Night Court; the character was initially rather conservative, but changed after the sitcom's creator Reinhold Weege came to learn more about Larroquette's sense of humor. The role won him Emmy Awards in 1985, 1986, 1987 and 1988. In 1989, he asked not to be considered for an Emmy Award. His four consecutive wins were, at the time, a record.

Night Court ran on NBC from 1984 until 1992. Larroquette, Harry Anderson (as Judge Harry Stone), and Richard Moll (as bailiff Bull Shannon) appeared in every episode of the series. There was talk of spinning Dan Fielding off into his own show, but Larroquette said no to the idea.  Rather, Larroquette ended up on the 2023 series continuation as the only regular character from the original in the revival.

The John Larroquette Show
Instead of a spinoff, Larroquette and Don Reo developed a show revolving around some of Larroquette's own personal demons, particularly alcoholism. The John Larroquette Show, named by the insistence of NBC, starred Larroquette as the character John Hemingway. The show was lauded by critics, but failed to attract the prime-time audience, ranking around number 97 for most of the first season.  NBC threatened cancellation; however, Larroquette and Reo were granted the chance to retool the series, which saw it carry on for just over two more seasons.  The show has a loyal cult following, although the series has never received an official home video release from Warner Bros.

Boston Legal and other television roles
In 1998, he guest-starred on three episodes of the legal drama The Practice. His portrayal of Joey Heric, a wealthy, wisecracking, narcissistic psychopath with a habit of stabbing his gay lovers to death, won him his fifth Emmy Award. He reprised the role for one episode in 2002, for which he was once again Emmy Award–nominated. He also appeared in an episode of The West Wing as Lionel Tribbey, White House Counsel.

In 2003, Larroquette reprised his narration for the remake of The Texas Chainsaw Massacre. From 2004 to 2006, he played the title role in the McBride series of 10 Hallmark Mysteries television films. In 2007, he joined the cast of Boston Legal playing Carl Sack, a serious, ethical lawyer (the polar opposite of his more famous lawyer character, Dan Fielding). He also guest-starred in the drama House where he played a previously catatonic father awakened to try to save his son, and on Chuck as veteran spy Roan Montgomery.

He had voice roles in Phineas and Ferb as Bob Weber, as a lifeguard, and as a man about to marry the boys' aunt, Tiana Weber.

From 2014 to 2018, Larroquette was a regular on The Librarians as Jenkins (actually the long-lived Camelot knight Sir Galahad), who provides support to the Librarians as a researcher and caretaker.

In 2019, he appeared in a recurring role in the series Blood & Treasure, as Jacob "Jay" Reece, a billionaire and father figure to main character Danny.

Film
His starring roles include the 1989 film Second Sight with Bronson Pinchot, and Madhouse with Kirstie Alley. Other films in which Larroquette had significant roles include: Blind Date, Stripes, Meatballs Part II, Summer Rental, Star Trek III: The Search for Spock, JFK and Richie Rich. He also starred in Demon Knight at the beginning, as a hackman; he received no credit.

Theatre
Larroquette made his musical stage debut in the Los Angeles production of How the Grinch Stole Christmas! as Old Max in 2009. He made his Broadway debut in the 2011 revival of How to Succeed in Business Without Really Trying as J B. Biggley alongside Daniel Radcliffe. He won the Tony Award for Best Featured Actor in a Musical and the Drama Desk Award for Outstanding Featured Actor in a Musical for his performance in the show.

He also appeared on Broadway in a revival of Gore Vidal's The Best Man, the cast of which also included James Earl Jones, Angela Lansbury, Candice Bergen, Mark Blum, Eric McCormack, Jefferson Mays, and Michael McKean, who needed to be replaced after suffering a car accident during the run of the show.

In early 2019, he was back in New York City starring in the play Nantucket Sleigh Ride by John Guare, at the Lincoln Center Theatre. In this off-beat play, Larroquette portrayed the lead character, Edmund "Mundie" Gowery, for a three-month run.

Personal life
Larroquette met his wife Elizabeth Ann Cookson in 1974 while working in the play Enter Laughing. They were married July 4, 1975, as that was the only day they had off from rehearsals. Cookson brought her daughter Lisa from a previous relationship into the marriage, and she and Larroquette would have two sons together, Jonathan and Benjamin. Jonathan co-hosts a comedy podcast called "Uhh Yeah Dude".

Larroquette battled alcoholism from the mid-1970s to the early 1980s. On The Tonight Show with Jay Leno on March 10, 2007, he joked, "I was known to have a cocktail or 60." He stopped drinking on February 6, 1982.

Filmography

Film

Television

Theatre

Awards and nominations

References

External links

 
 
 
 
 
 The Onion A.V. Club Random Roles interview

1947 births
20th-century American male actors
21st-century American male actors
Living people
American male film actors
American male musical theatre actors
American male stage actors
American male television actors
American television directors
American male voice actors
American people of French descent
Drama Desk Award winners
Male actors from New Orleans
Outstanding Performance by a Supporting Actor in a Comedy Series Primetime Emmy Award winners
Tony Award winners
Theatre World Award winners